The Pledge of Allegiance is the national pledge of The Commonwealth of the Bahamas which was written by Rev. Philip Rahming.

The Pledge
I Pledge my allegiance to the flag and to the Commonwealth of The Bahamas

For which it stands, one people united in love and service.

References

Society of the Bahamas